Shivkumar Bilagrami (शिवकुमार बिलग्रामी) is a contemporary Hindi/Urdu Poet. He was born in the Bilgram Tahsil, Hardoi District of Uttar Pradesh. He has been regular poet in Delhi Circle Kavi Sammelans, Mushayara and Cultural Programmes.

Early life
He was born in Village Mahsonmau, Tahsil Bilgram. His father Late Shri Raghubar Singh was a political and social activist of this region. Bilagrami completed his schooling from BGR Inter College, Bilgram and later did his Masters in English Literature from Lucknow University, Lucknow.

He started his career as a Journalist and worked for several newspapers and news agencies.

He joined Parliament of India and presently he is Editor in Lok Sabha Secretariat, New Delhi.

Publications
 Naee Kahakashan is a compilation of Gazals.
 Wo Do Pal is a compilation of Gazals.

Indian male poets

Year of birth missing (living people)
Living people